The longfin lizardfish (Saurida longimanus), also known as the longfin saury, is a species of lizardfish that lives in the Indo-Pacific.

Size
The average length of a longfin lizardfish unsexed male is about 25 centimeters.

Habitat
The habitat of the longfin lizardfish is in tropical marine environments at a demersal depth range.

Distribution
The longfin lizardfish can be found in:
Indo-West Pacific
Gulf of Oman
Southern Indonesia 
Arafura Sea
Northern and Northwestern Australia

References

Notes

External links
 Fishes of Australia : Saurida longimanus

longfin lizardfish
Marine fish of Northern Australia
longfin lizardfish